Ali Mohammad Noorian (born 20 January 1949) is an Iranian politician and academic who is the acting president of the Islamic Azad University system.

Early life and education
He was born on 20 November 1949 in Shemiran, Tehran. He was educated in Tehran and received his diploma in Mathematics. Then, he studied Applied Physics and graduated from Sharif University of Technology in 1973. Noorian began his work as an expert and manager. He has Master of Public Administration. He got his master's degree in electrical engineering from Cardiff University. He received his Ph.D degree in electrical engineering from Sharif University of Technology and University of Wales. He has 3 children.

Political career

Noorian  had served political positions in some governments, such as Akbar Hashemi Rafsanjani, Mohammad Khatami, etc.

References

Living people
1949 births
Sharif University of Technology alumni
Iranian politicians
People from Tehran
World Meteorological Organization people